Payal Dev is an Indian playback singer and music composer who sings and composes music for Bollywood films.
She sang "Ab Tohe Jane Na Doongi" from the film Bajirao Mastani, as well as "Bhare Bazaar" from Namaste England. Dev made her debut as a composer in the song "Dil Jaaniye" for the film Khandaani Shafakhana. She also achieved success in composing Tum Hi Aana for the film Marjaavaan. She is also known for her rendition of the song "Genda Phool" which has 850 million views as of Sept 2021 on YouTube. Next she 
sang "Baarish Ban Jaana"
in 2021.The Song become super hit.Which has 500 Million views as of Jun 2022 on YouTube

Personal life
Dev's husband, Aditya Dev, is a music producer in Bollywood. The couple has a daughter, named Jazz.

Discography

Discography as a member of Apni Dhun 
Dev, in collaboration with her husband – Aditya Dev, started an independent music platform named Apni Dhun in 2020. Payal and Aditya, along with Bollywood lyricist Kunaal Vermaa, have collaborated with several artists such as Altaf Raja, B Praak etc.

References

External links

Official website

Living people
Bollywood playback singers
Singers from Jharkhand
Indian women singers
Indian women composers
1989 births